Audrick Linord (born 17 April 1987) is a footballer from Martinique who plays for Club Colonial of the Martinique Championnat National as of 2017.

SO Romorantin

Shortly after his arrival from Tours in 2010, Linord suffered an injury on his right leg, forcing him to undergo operations; he was fully rejuvenated by 2011.

Owing to the suspension of Giany Joinville, the Martinique centre-back became a temporary starter, forming a defensive line with teammate Fabrice Nicolas.

References

External links 
  
 at National-Football-Teams

1987 births
Living people
Martiniquais footballers
Association football defenders
Martinique international footballers
Tours FC players
People from La Trinité, Martinique
US Changé players
SO Romorantin players
FC Villefranche Beaujolais players
2013 CONCACAF Gold Cup players
2019 CONCACAF Gold Cup players